The Browns Point Lighthouse is a lighthouse located near Tacoma on Browns Point at the east entrance to Puget Sound's Commencement Bay, Pierce County, Washington.

History
A wood-frame lighthouse and separate keepers cottage were built in 1901. The current lighthouse was built in 1933 and automated in 1963. The lighthouse plus the original keeper's cottage, oil house and boathouse are listed on the National Register of Historic Places.

Public access
The Points Northeast Historical Society rents out the keeper's cottage with the renter serving as an honorary lightkeeper who conducts lighthouse tours on Saturday afternoons. The Society also operates two museums by the lighthouse: the History Center with changing history exhibits and the Boat House Museum with displays of a replica surfboat and maritime artifacts. The lighthouse is on the grounds of Browns Point Lighthouse Park which offers picnicking and scenic vistas of sea traffic and mountains.

References

More reading

External links

Browns Point Lighthouse Park Metro Parks Tacoma 
Points Northeast Historical Society

Lighthouses completed in 1887
Lighthouses completed in 1933
Lighthouses on the National Register of Historic Places in Washington (state)
Transportation buildings and structures in Pierce County, Washington
Maritime museums in Washington (state)
Museums in Pierce County, Washington
Lighthouse museums in Washington (state)
National Register of Historic Places in Pierce County, Washington